Apertura feudi, in ancient law books, denotes the loss of a feudal land tenure, by default of issue to him, to whom the feud or fee was first granted.

References
 

Feudalism
Latin legal terminology